Finchley Central is a mind game in which two players take turns naming stations in the London Underground. The first person to name Finchley Central is the winner. Of course, the first player could say "Finchley Central" straight away, but as mathematics professor Jonathan Partington notes, 
An opening move of "Finchley Central" is too much of a cheat, and you might wish to start with, say, Liverpool Street, when, assuming that your opponent isn't rude enough to reply with Finchley Central, leaves you with a mate on your second move (though you probably would prefer to stall by playing, say, Bank, in the hopes of a more spectacular win later).

Possibly inspired by The New Vaudeville Band's song "Finchley Central" ("Finchley Central / is two-and-sixpence / from Golders Green on the Northern Line..."), the game was first described by the mathematicians Anatole Beck and David Fowler in the Spring 1969 issue of Manifold magazine (A Pandora's Box of Non-games page 32). Beck and Fowler note,
It is clear that the ‘best’ time to say Finchley Central is exactly before your opponent does. Failing that it is good that he should be considering it. You could, of course, say ‘Finchley Central’ on your second turn. In that case, your opponent puffs on his cigarette and says, ‘Well… Shame on you.’

Finchley Central became the basis for the game Mornington Crescent in the BBC Radio 4 series I'm Sorry I Haven't a Clue. A 1976 variant where the first person to think of Finchley Central station loses has been suggested as a possible origin for The Game.

In a similar game played in Slavic countries, kaladont, each player has to say a word starting with the last two letters of the previous player's word, and the player who can't continue loses the game. There are many words ending in unplayable combinations (like "kaladont"), but it is often considered poor form to end the game quickly even if all players are good.

References

External links
 Manifold issue 3 (Spring 1969), Ian Stewart (editor), University of Warwick 

Games of mental skill